Gildo Bocci (1 September 1886 – 22 July 1964) was an Italian film actor. He appeared in 60 films between 1913 and 1959. He was born and died in Rome, Italy.

Partial filmography

 Messalina (1924) - Apollonio
 Quo Vadis (1924) - Vittelius
 The Last Days of Pompeii (1926) - Diomede
 Da Icaro a de Pinedo (1927)
 Boccaccesca (1928)
 The Storyteller of Venice (1929)
 Maratona (1929) - Giovanne, Il Massaggiatore
 Everybody's Woman (1934) - Il regista
 L'avvocato difensore (1935) - Angelo
 Ho perduto mio marito (1939)
 Dora Nelson (1940) - Pasquale, il tassista
 Arditi civili (1940) - Il vigile del fuoco a riposo Checco Focone
 Validità giorni dieci (1940) - Il cuoco dell'albergo Mondiale
 The Palace on the River (1940) - Un terzo barbone
 Antonio Meucci (1940)
 La donna perduta (1940) - Galileo
 Captain Fracasse (1940) - Il capitano delle guardie
 L'uomo del romanzo (1940) - Il fattore
 Marco Visconti (1941) - Il taverniere
 The Mask of Cesare Borgia (1941) - Ramiro d'Orca
 Scampolo (1941) - Il fioraio
 Confessione (1941)
 The King's Jester (1941) - Il Gran Visir
 The Jester's Supper (1942) - Il taverniere
 Cat People (1942) - Il sergente Mack
 Street of the Five Moons (1942) - Federico, padre di Ines
 Sleeping Beauty (1942) - Un mercante
 Rossini (1942) - Il duca di Sforza-Cesarini
 After Casanova's Fashion (1942) - Pacchialone
 Four Steps in the Clouds (1942) - Il contadino sulla corriera
 Music on the Run (1943) - Il vagabondo
 The White Angel (1943) - Domenico, il mugnaio
 La valle del diavolo (1943) - Il postiglione
 La vita è bella (1943) - Il fattore
 Non mi muovo! (1943) - Il portiere della casa vecchia
 Tutta la vita in ventiquattr'ore (1943) - Cesare, il padre di Giulio
 Zazà (1944) - Malardot, l'impresario teatrale
 The Gates of Heaven (1945)
 L'invasore (1949) - Custode di Villa Valfreda
 47 morto che parla (1950) - Il macellaio
 Sambo (1950)
 Seven Hours of Trouble (1951) - L'ubriaco
 O.K. Nero! (1951)
 I'm the Hero (1952) - Proprietario carrettino gelati
 The Secret of Three Points (1952) - Mercante
 Il romanzo della mia vita (1952) - The Trattoria Owner
 La figlia del diavolo (1952) - Il signor Fratta
 Una donna prega (1953)
 Roman Holiday (1953) - Flower Seller (uncredited)
 Anni facili (1953)
 Noi cannibali (1953)
 Gran varietà (1954) - direttore del cinematografo (episodio 'Il fine dicitore')
 Days of Love (1954) - Il maresciallo
 Queen of Babylon (1954)
 Are We Men or Corporals? (1955)
 La ladra (1955) - Lo Professore
 Uncle Hyacynth (1955) - Dueño de la relojería
 The Band of Honest Men (1956) - Tabaccaio (uncredited)
 Due sosia in allegria (1956)
 Time of Vacation (1956) - Zio Santino
 Poveri ma belli (1957) - Father of Romolo
 Pretty But Poor (1957) - Sor Nerone Toccacieli
 Onore e sangue (1957) - Giannone Ferretti - the usurer
 Tuppe tuppe, Marescià! (1958) - Bar Customer
 Conspiracy of the Borgias (1959)
 Poveri milionari (1959)

References

External links

1886 births
1964 deaths
Italian male film actors
Italian male silent film actors
20th-century Italian male actors